Tim Brys (born 30 July 1992) is a Belgian competitive rower. He competed at the 2020 Summer Olympics in Tokyo 2021, in men's lightweight double sculls.

References

External links

 

1992 births
Living people
Belgian male rowers
Rowers at the 2020 Summer Olympics
Olympic rowers of Belgium
Sportspeople from Ghent
21st-century Belgian people